Admiral Sir Thomas Williams GCB (c. 1761/62 – 8 October 1841) was a senior British Royal Navy officer of the late eighteenth and early nineteenth centuries, who served in numerous theatres during the American Revolutionary War, French Revolutionary Wars and Napoleonic Wars. As a young officer he fought at a number of battles in the Caribbean and as a frigate captain he was knighted for his actions at the action of 8 June 1796 in which two French frigates were captured without a single man killed or wounded on Williams' ship . Later in his career, Williams commanded squadrons blockading the European coast and assisting the supply of the British Army during the Peninsula War.

Life
Williams was born in 1761 or 1762, the son of Naval Captain William Williams. Aged only 7, Thomas Williams was entered as a servant on his father's ship , although it is likely that he did not spend much time aboard. He is reported to have followed his father through various commands (although many of these commissions were on paper only) until 1776, when he was certainly present at the Battle of Sullivan's Island, aboard the brig . Prince of Wales was subsequently engaged at the Battle of St. Lucia in 1778 and the Battle of Grenada in 1779. Returning briefly to Britain, Williams returned to the Americas the following year with Vice-Admiral Marriott Arbuthnot and fought at the Battle of Cape Henry.

In June 1796, Unicorn and another frigate encountered two French frigates: the French ships divided and the British ships followed them, Unicorn chasing and engaging the Tribune. After a running fight, Tribune was captured, Williams achieving his victory without a single casualty. For his services in the action, Williams was knighted by King George III. During the winter of 1796, Unicorn formed part the squadron operating against the French Expédition d'Irlande and was present at the capture of the transport Ville de Lorient.

In March 1797, Williams became commander of the new frigate  and in October joined the North Sea fleet with orders to pursue the scattered Dutch ships in the aftermath of the Battle of Camperdown. With hours, Endymion encountered the ship of the line Brutus close inshore, but the protected anchorage prevented Williams from successfully attacking the Dutch ship and she was able to escape. For the next three years, Williams was employed off Ireland and on convoy to the island of St Helena. In 1801, Williams took command of the 74-gun third-rate ship of the line ) and operated in the Baltic Sea and off Cadiz. He remained in that position until 1814, retiring as a vice-admiral and establishing the Naval Female School as his final act, donating £1,000 to the school's endowment (the equivalent of  £ as of ).

In his personal life, Williams was married three times. First he married in 1792 Jane Cooper, who died in a carriage accident in 1798 on the Isle of Wight. (Jane Cooper was a cousin of the novelist Jane Austen). In 1800 he married secondly a Miss Whapshare, who died in 1824. He married thirdly in April 1825 Mary Anne Mallory. It is said he remarried as he had had such a happy first marriage.

During his retirement, Williams lived at Burwood House near Weybridge, Surrey and was promoted to admiral and advanced to a Knight Grand Cross of the Order of the Bath. He held the post of Commander-in-Chief, Portsmouth from 1833 to 1836 and died in October 1841.

Notes

References
Williams, Sir Thomas, Oxford Dictionary of National Biography, J. K. Laughton, (subscription required), Retrieved 12 April 2009

|-

1760s births
1841 deaths
Royal Navy admirals
Royal Navy personnel of the French Revolutionary Wars
Royal Navy personnel of the Napoleonic Wars
Knights Grand Cross of the Order of the Bath
Knights Bachelor